A hutch is a type of cage used typically for housing domestic rabbits.  Other small animals can also be housed in hutches such as guinea pigs, ferrets, and hamsters.

Most hutches have a frame constructed of wood, including legs to keep the unit off the ground. The floor may be wood, wire mesh, or some combination of the two. Wire mesh is very bad for rabbits' feet and can cause sore hocks. One or more walls of the hutch are also wire mesh to allow for ventilation. Some hutches have built-in nest boxes and shingled roofs—these are generally intended to be placed directly outside rather than inside another shelter such as a barn. Some hutches have a felt roof. In any case it is important that the hutch is draft-free and provides a shelter in case the animal is scared and wants to retreat to a safe haven. Not only will this help protect your pet from harsh weather conditions, but also predator attacks.

The generally accepted minimum hutch size is 10 square feet for a 4 kg medium-sized breed. If the animal is very protective or even aggressive, this is generally a sign that the hutch is too small. However, it has in the past decade, become unacceptable for people who are more knowledgeable about rabbits' needs that they should live in a hutch of this size, or any small cage for that matter. Rabbits love to run and jump and need space. For many animal rescues, now a predator safe run must be attached to, or contain the hutch; the run must be at least  10 ft x 6 ft with a run height of 3 ft, or in metric, 3m x 2m and a run height of 1m. (Rabbit Welfare Association and Trust, 2018) Even more space to live in is better.Rabbits and other small and would thrive better if in doors and not in any kind of hutch or cage

References

Buildings and structures used to confine animals
Domesticated animals
Rabbits as pets